Mitte (German for "middle" or "center") is a central locality of Berlin in the eponymous district of Mitte. Until 2001, it was itself an autonomous district.

Mitte proper comprises the historic center of Alt-Berlin centered on the churches of St. Nicholas and St. Mary, the Museum Island, the city hall Rotes Rathaus, the city administrative building Altes Stadthaus, the Fernsehturm, Brandenburg Gate at the end of the central boulevard Unter den Linden and other tourist attractions. For these reasons, Mitte is considered the "heart" of Berlin.

History

Mitte comprises the historic center of Berlin ( and ). Its history thus corresponds to the history of the entire city until the early 20th century, and with the Greater Berlin Act in 1920 it became the first district of the city. It was among the areas of the city most heavily damaged in World War II.

Following a territorial redeployment by the Soviet Union and the United Kingdom that reshaped the borders of West Berlin's British Sector in August 1945, the western part of Staaken became in effect as of 1 February 1951 an exclave of Mitte, then still a borough of East Berlin. This ended on 1 January 1961, when western Staaken was incorporated into then East German Falkensee, which had already been under its de facto administration since 1 June 1952.

Between 1961 and 1990, Mitte, one of the most important boroughs of East Berlin but close to all three western sectors of the city, was almost surrounded by the Berlin Wall. One of the most important border crossings was Checkpoint Charlie, near Kreuzberg.

Geography

Position
Situated in central Berlin and mostly in its old town, it is traversed by the river Spree. It borders the localities of Tiergarten, Moabit, Wedding, Gesundbrunnen, Prenzlauer Berg (in Pankow district), Friedrichshain, and Kreuzberg (both in Friedrichshain-Kreuzberg district).

Subdivision
Mitte is subdivided into 13 zones or neighborhoods (Stadtviertel) (the numbers refer to the map above right):
Cölln (1)
Museum Island (1a)
Fisher Island (1b)
Alt-Berlin (2)
Nikolaiviertel (2a)
Friedrichswerder (3)
Neukölln am Wasser (4)
Dorotheenstadt (5)
Friedrichstadt (6)
Luisenstadt (7)
Stralauer Vorstadt (8)
Alexanderplatz (9)
Spandauer Vorstadt (10)
Scheunenviertel (10a)
Friedrich-Wilhelm-Stadt (11)
Oranienburger Vorstadt (12)
Rosenthaler Vorstadt (13)

Sister cities
 Higashiōsaka, Japan
 Holon, Israel

Main sights

Buildings and structures

Alte Nationalgalerie
Altes Museum
Altes Stadthaus
Berlin Cathedral
Berlin Palace with the Humboldt Forum
Berlin State Opera
Berliner Ensemble
Brandenburg Gate
Bode Museum
Bundesrat of Germany
Checkpoint Charlie
Deutscher Dom
Fernsehturm Berlin
Französischer Dom
Friedrichstadt-Palast
Friedrichswerder Church
Humboldt University
James Simon Gallery
Kino Babylon
Konzerthaus Berlin
Kunsthaus Tacheles
Marienkirche
Neue Synagoge
Neues Museum
Nikolaikirche
Palast der Republik
Pergamon Museum
Reich Air Ministry
Rotes Rathaus
St. Hedwig's Cathedral
Sophienkirche
Staatsratsgebäude
Stadtschloß

Places, squares and streets

Alexanderplatz
Bernauer Straße
Friedrichstraße
Gendarmenmarkt
Karl-Marx-Allee
Leipziger Straße
Lustgarten
Marx-Engels-Forum
Molkenmarkt
Museum Island
Nikolaiviertel
Oranienburger Straße
Pariser Platz
Potsdamer Platz
Schloßplatz
Unter den Linden

Photogallery

Transportation

Mitte is served by S-Bahn lines S5, S7, S75, S9 (both on Berlin Stadtbahn); S1, S2, S25, and U-Bahn lines U2, U5, U6 and U8, as well as numerous tram and bus lines.

See also
Berlin Alexanderplatz railway station
Berlin Friedrichstrasse railway station
Berlin Potsdamer Platz railway station

References

External links

Webpage of Mitte Ortsteil on www.berlin.de

Localities of Berlin
Mitte
Former boroughs of Berlin